Chicoreus rachelcarsonae is a species of sea snail, a marine gastropod mollusk in the family Muricidae, the murex snails or rock snails.

Description
Original description: "Shell delicate, very frondose, with 3 varices per whorl; one large knob along shoulder between varices; varix with 5 spines; 
spines often frondose; siphonal canal with 3 large spines; spine on shoulder largest; spire high and elevated; shell color pink or pale salmon-orange overlaid with numerous fine, pale tan spiral threads; spines often darker pinkish red or orange-red; protoconch and early whorls bright orange-red; siphonal canal completely closed."

Distribution
Locus typicus: "(Trawled from) 150 metres depth, 
50 kilometres South of Apalachicola, Florida, USA."

References

Gastropods described in 1987
Chicoreus